Americans for Democratic Action (ADA) is a liberal American political organization advocating progressive policies. ADA views itself as supporting social and economic justice through lobbying, grassroots organizing, research, and supporting progressive candidates.

History

Formation
The ADA grew out of a predecessor group, the Union for Democratic Action (UDA). The UDA was formed by former members of the Socialist Party of America and the Committee to Defend America by Aiding the Allies as well as labor union leaders, liberal politicians, theologians, and others who were opposed to the pacifism adopted by most left-wing political organizations in the late 1930s and early 1940s. It supported an interventionist, internationalist foreign policy and a pro-union, liberal domestic policy. It was also strongly anti-communist. It undertook a major effort to support left-wing Democratic members of Congress in 1946, but this effort was an overwhelming failure. 

James Isaac Loeb (later an ambassador and diplomat in the John F. Kennedy administration), the UDA's executive director, advocated disbanding the UDA and forming a new, more broadly based, mass-membership organization. The ADA was formed on January 3, 1947, and the UDA shuttered.

Among ADA's founding members were leading anti-communist liberals from academic, political, and labor circles, including theologian Reinhold Niebuhr, historian Arthur M. Schlesinger Jr., Eleanor Roosevelt, union leader Walter Reuther, civil rights lawyer Joseph Rauh, and Hubert Humphrey. Its founders hoped to solidify a progressive, pragmatic, noncommunist "vital center" in mainstream politics, embodying Schlesinger's concept formulated in his 1949 book The Vital Center.

Action
On April 3, 1948, ADA declared its decision to support a Democratic Party ticket of General Dwight D. Eisenhower and Supreme Court Judge William O. Douglas over incumbent U.S. President Harry S. Truman. Truman lacked popular support, and the ADA succeeded in pushing Truman leftward on issues such as civil rights. It also led a full-scale attack on Progressive Party candidate and former US vice president Henry A. Wallace because of his opposition to the Marshall Plan and support for appeasement of the Soviet Union. The ADA portrayed Wallace and his supporters as dupes of the Communist Party. Adolf A. Berle Jr. and Franklin Delano Roosevelt Jr. believed that Eisenhower would accept the nomination.  He did not.

ADA supported Truman after his victory in the 1948 election.

Though anti-communist, unlike other contemporary liberal groups like the Progressive Citizens of America (PCA), which supported cooperation with the Soviet Union, the ADA was still subject to significant McCarthyist scrutiny.  The plight of the ADA during that period prompted Eleanor Roosevelt to accept a position as honorary chair of the organization in 1953, and in doing so, put Senator McCarthy in a position in which he would have had to "call her a communist as well" to continue his inquiries into the activities of the group.  Because of her actions, many ADA leaders credited her with saving the organization.

In the early 1960s, ADA's influence peaked when a number of its key members (e.g. James Loeb, Arthur Schlesinger Jr.) were picked to join the administration of U.S. President John F. Kennedy. While active in liberal causes ranging from civil rights to Lyndon B. Johnson's Great Society reforms, by the mid-1960s the ADA's influence was on the wane. It was badly split over the Vietnam War: initially supporting Johnson's war policy, the ADA had come to oppose the war by early 1968. It endorsed founder Hubert Humphrey's presidential candidacy that year, but with "barely concealed ambivalence". After Richard Nixon's victory, the ADA was pushed to the political margins, overshadowed by more centrist groups like the Trilateral Commission and Coalition for a Democratic Majority.

Leadership

Founders
Prominent founding members included:
 Joseph Alsop
 Stewart Alsop
 Chester Bowles
 Marquis Childs
 David Dubinsky

 Elmer Davis
 John Kenneth Galbraith
 Leon Henderson
 Hubert Humphrey
 James I. Loeb
 Reinhold Niebuhr
 Joseph P. Lash
 Joseph L. Rauh Jr.
 Walter Reuther
 Eleanor Roosevelt
 Franklin Delano Roosevelt Jr.
 Arthur Schlesinger Jr.
 John H. Sengstacke
 James Wechsler
 Walter White
 Wilson W. Wyatt

In April 1948 at New York state convention, ADA elected the following new officers:  Jonathan Bingham of Scarborough as chairman with vice chairmen Dr. William Lehman of Syracuse, Benjamin Mc:Laurin of New York City, Howard Linsay of New York City, Jack Rubenstein (Textile Workers Union, CIO), and Charles Zimmerman (International Ladies' Garment Workers Union).

Chairs and presidents

Since 1947, ADA's leaders have been:

 1947–1948:  Wilson Wyatt 
 1948–1949:  Leon Henderson 
 1949–1950:  Senator Hubert Humphrey 
 1950–1953:  Francis Biddle
 1954–1955:  Arthur Schlesinger Jr.  and James E. Doyle (co-chairs)
 1955–1957:  Joseph L. Rauh Jr. 
 1957–1959:  Robert R. Nathan
 1959–1962:  Samuel H. Beer
 1961–1964:  Paul Seabury
 1962–1965:  John P. Roche
 1965–1967:  Rep. Don Edwards
 1967–1969:  John Kenneth Galbraith 
 1970–1971:  Joseph Duffey
 1971–1973:  Rep. Allard K. Lowenstein
 1974–1976:  Rep. Donald M. Fraser
 1976–1978:  Senator George McGovern
 1978–1981:  Rep. Patsy T. Mink
 1981–1984:  Rep. Robert F. Drinan, S.J.
 1984–1986:  Rep. Barney Frank
 1986–1989:  Rep. Ted Weiss
 1989–1991:  Rep. Charles B. Rangel
 1991–1993:  Senator Paul D. Wellstone
 1993–1995:  Rep. John Lewis
 1995–1998:  Jack Sheinkman
 1998–2000:  Rep. Jim Jontz
 2000–2008:  Rep. Jim McDermott
 2008–2010:  Richard Parker
 2010–2016: Rep. Lynn Woolsey
 2017–2018: State Senator Daylin Leach
 2018–: State Senator Art Haywood

Voting records 
ADA ranks legislators, identifies key policy issues, and tracks how members of Congress vote on these issues. The annual ADA Voting Record gives each member a Liberal Quotient (LQ) rating from 0, meaning complete disagreement with ADA policies, to 100, meaning complete agreement with ADA policies. A score of 0 is considered conservative and a score 100 is considered liberal.  The LQ is obtained by evaluating an elected official's votes on 20 key foreign and domestic social and economic issues chosen by the ADA's Legislative Committee.  Each vote given a score of either 5 or 0 points, depending on whether the individual voted with or against the ADA's position, respectively.  Absent voters are also given a score of 0 for the vote.

See also

 Progressive Citizens of America

References

External links
 
 Americans for Democratic Action records, 1932–1999

Organizations established in 1947
Political advocacy groups in the United States
Liberalism in the United States
1947 establishments in the United States
Walter Reuther